Martensia natalensis is a species of red algae.

References

Species described in 2009
Delesseriaceae